Rhyme Stew is a 1989 collection of poems for children by Roald Dahl, illustrated by Quentin Blake. In a sense it is a more adult version of Revolting Rhymes (1982).

The poems either parody well known fairy tales (Dick Whittington and His Cat, The Tortoise and the Hare, The Emperor's New Clothes, Ali Baba, Hansel and Gretel, Aladdin) nursery rhymes (As I was going to St Ives, Hey Diddle Diddle, Mary, Mary Quite Contrary) or are little stories thought up by Dahl himself.

Most of the stories contain slight sexual references. Due to slightly risqué material this book carries a warning that it is unsuitable for "small people".

Contents
Dick Whittington and His Cat
St. Ives
A Hand in the Bird
The Tortoise and the Hare
The Price of Debauchery
Physical Training
The Emperor's New Clothes
A Little Nut Tree
The Dentist and the Crocodile
Hot and Cold
Ali Baba and the Forty Thieves
Hey Diddle Diddle
Mary, Mary
Hansel and Gretel
Aladdin and the Magic Lamp

1989 children's books
1989 poetry books
British children's books
Children's poetry books
Literature based on fairy tales
Works based on fables
Works based on nursery rhymes
Works based on Hansel and Gretel
Works based on One Thousand and One Nights
Works based on The Emperor's New Clothes
Poetry by Roald Dahl
Books about cats
Books about turtles
Jonathan Cape books
Nonsense poetry
Fairy tale parodies